Oaklawn Plantation may refer to:
Oaklawn (Huntsville, Alabama), listed on the National Register of Historic Places (NRHP)
Oaklawn Plantation (Leon County, Florida)
Oaklawn Plantation (Natchez, Louisiana), listed on the NRHP
Oaklawn Manor (Franklin, Louisiana), listed on the NRHP